The Prayer of Jabez: Breaking Through to the Blessed Life is a book by Bruce Wilkinson published in 2000 by Multnomah Books as the first book in the "BreakThrough" book series. It is based on the Old Testament passage 1 Chronicles 4:9–10:

In the book, Wilkinson encourages Christians to invoke this prayer for themselves on a daily basis:

The book became an international bestseller, topping the New York Times bestseller list and selling nine million copies. It received the Evangelical Christian Publishers Association Gold Medallion Book of the Year award in 2001.

The book has also been criticized and compared to the "prosperity gospel".

Derivative works and merchandise
The popularity of the original book has led its publisher, Multnomah Press, to extend the line to a number of derivative works targeted at niche audiences, as well as to offer the books in audio and video formats. They also authorized a wide array of official "Prayer of Jabez" merchandise including key chains, mugs, backpacks, Christmas ornaments, scented candles, mouse pads and a framed artist's conception of Jabez himself. A line of jewelry was introduced in 2002.
Three versions rewritten for children, one each targeted at preschoolers, 8-12 year olds and teens
The Prayer of Jabez Journal
The Prayer of Jabez Devotional (one edition for children, one for adults)
The Prayer of Jabez Bible Study
The Prayer of Jabez for Women written by Wilkinson's wife, Darlene
a musical companion, The Prayer of Jabez Music ... A Worship Experience (ForeFront Records)
The Healing of Jabez by John W. Mauck ('Credo House Publishers) was published in 2009.

CriticismJabez has been compared to the "prosperity gospel" and has received the reproaches often addressed toward that doctrine, e.g. that the Jabez prayer suggests that God ought to do what people want rather than them following God's will. Some have taken issue with the form of the prayer, citing Jesus' admonition against "vain repetitions" in Matthew 6:7-9. The commercialization of Jabez has also attracted criticism. At the same time, adherents have responded by saying that to decry the prayer of Jabez is to call into question the efficacy of prayer in general.  

The prayer of Jabez became very popular within sections of the fundamentalist Pentecostal Christian movement.  It was particularly evident in those churches associated with the New Apostolic Reformation, Kingdom Now theology, Dominion theology, Five-fold ministry thinking and other fringe-like elements within the Spirit-filled Christianity movement.  Some within the movement took it to excess, using the prayer in an almost superstitious way, believing it to be a harbinger of prosperity, good fortune, wealth, health and happiness.  At the same time, it was, at times, promoted by some leaders who benefited personally and/or corporately through their religious organizations by on-selling the vast range of commercial merchandise associated with the prayer.  Some leaders even sought to convince followers that these items of merchandise carried with them special powers attributed to the anointing of the Holy Spirit.  This attracted criticism from more conservative, non-Pentecostal Christian leaders on the grounds it encouraged a shallow, self-centered spiritual mindset. The Mantra of Jabez : A Christian Parody by Douglas M. Jones (Canon Press) was published in 2001.The Cult of Jabez... and the falling away of the church in America, a book alleging an un-biblical premise of Wilkinson's book, reached as high as number 77 on Amazon's top 100 books list in 2002.The Jabez you Never Knew: Hebraic Keys to Answered Prayers, by Norm Franz, was written to give a historic perspective on the account of Jabez, and to criticize the original work for its emphasis on rote prayer.

The recording artist Derek Webb has said that his controversial song "Wedding Dress" was written after he saw Wilkinson speak about The Prayer of Jabez''. Similarly, the Ceili Rain satirical song "Gold God" takes issue with this concept (if not the book) as well, noting the God who "expanded my territory" is "like a Visa card".

References

External links
 In Defense of 'Jabez,' First Things, October 2001.
Critical reviews of Jabez
 A theological critique of Jabez
 Review of the theological implications of the book by the Lutheran Church-Missouri Synod
 Van Biema, David, "A Prayer with Wings", Time magazine

2000 non-fiction books
Evangelical Christian literature
Christian devotional literature
Christian prayer
2000 in Christianity
Controversies in Christian literature